Hydro-slotting perforation technology is the process of opening the productive formation through the casing and cement sheath to produce the oil or gas product flow (intensification, stimulation). The process has been used for industrial drilling since 1980, and involves the use of an underground hydraulic slotting engine (tool, equipment). The technology helps to minimize compressive stress following drilling in the well-bore zone (which reduces the permeability in the zone).

Overview 

Since ancient times, when there were the first coal mines, it was observed, that increasing the depth of the development the coal tunnel, under the action of overburden pressure, surrounding rocks become harder and little-permeable. To solve this problem they developed a cavern of a certain form in the rock. More modern mining geo-mechanics explain the reason for the occurrence of this effect in relation to drilling wells. During any drilling process in the well there is formed the annular compressive stress conditions around the wellbore zone. The deeper the well, the more overburden pressure, which means the greater the annular compressive stress conditions. On the rocks lying at depths of 3–5 km the compressive stresses may reach up-to 75–125 MPa. In the near-well zone, as a result of concentration these stresses increase and sometimes become equal to double 150–250 MPa. If the tectonic stresses is several times higher than stresses from the weight of rocks, the stresses in the near-well zone may be even greater.

Under the action of stress conditions and high overburden pressure occurs a significant reduction in permeability in the near wellbore zone, in some cases close to zero. Oil or gas flow can not penetrate to the well. Traditional methods of opening the productive layer formation (cumulative, jet perforation, sand jet perforation, abrasive jetting perforation and other similar methods) did not consider this complicated situation in the near-well zone and therefore was not the effective. Porous and fractured formations are subjected to compression, that deforms the rock mass and reduces its permeability. The greater the depth, the stronger the effect can be.

Hydro-slotting perforation is quite different from jet (hydro-jetting or sand-blast) perforation. The energy of working fluid, consisting from water (layer water) and sand (abrasive quartz sand) pressure in the hydraulic engine, is divided into two components: five percent of energy goes to the creation of smooth uniform rectilinear motion of the working rod with the perforator and nozzles (between two and six nozzles) without participation in the process the multimeter tubing or coil-tubing. Ninety-five percent of energy goes to the cutting of continued and geometrically correct deep slots (up to five feet deep and between three and five slots at the same time). Slot length is equal to the length of the working engine shaft, usually .

The hydro-slotting perforation process does not deform the casing, does not create cracks in the cement, and does not clog-up the borders in the formation.

The geometry and depth of the slots creates the conditions for occurrence of the effect of unloading the circular stress conditions in the near wellbore zone (from 50 to 100 percent) and accordingly the increase of permeability (up to 30 to 50 percent) in this zone. In addition to this it forms a large area of the penetration ( area for one cut with two nozzles only), that provides a very good hydrodynamic connection of the productive layer with the well.

The cutting speed may be corrected with the temperature in the borehole, temperature of the working fluid, concentration, flow and pressure. (these components are enough to completely control the depth and length of the cut and thus forming the slots), to instantly cut through the steel casing, through the cement to delve into the productive formation and keep the jets in this state while moving along the borehole, keeping the same depth of cut. At the end of the cutting continuous slot process the engine is set up to the initial position and ready for the next cutting interval. The process of hydro-slotting perforation and the depth of cut is controlled by the working fluid supply, pressure and concentration. The equipment can be operated without lifting on the surface for 11–15 hours.

Hydro-slotting perforation is the ecologically safe, environmentally friendly and effective affordable method for intensifying the operation in oil, gas, injection and hydro-geological wells. Now this method is widely used in Azerbaijan, Brazil, China, Eastern and Western Siberia, Jordan, Kazakhstan, Komi Republic, North Caucasus, Russia, Udmurtia, Ukraine, Urals, Uzbekistan and Yemen. The first mention regarding the hydro-slotting perforation in America, was in 1987 at the oil and gas conference in Texas. The first use of hydro-slotting perforation in the United States dates back to 1996, when together with Shell E & P Technology Company, discovered two wells (Abrasive Hydro jet Technology in Albert Load, Michigan). After that the hydro-slotting perforation was highly appreciated by the Department of Geophysics at Stanford University and by Division of Shell Exploration and Production by Shell E&P Technology Company. Hydro-slotting perforation was used in California, Kansas, Michigan, Montana, Nebraska, New York, Pennsylvania, Texas and Wyoming states. In Canada it has been successfully applied in Saskatchewan.

General concepts 

For opening of any productive layer it is necessary to open the casing, cement sheath and productive layer formation. Geophysics and mining geo-mechanics dictated the next requirements:
 Zone of cement sheath should be opened completely and not have cracks (to prevent possible overflows of water);
 Productive layer formation should be opened to maximum and on the maximum depth. At the same time productive formation should not have clogging, plugging, grouting, occlusive and cinder borders to produce excellent hydrodynamic connections of the productive layer with the well. Encompassing unloading the circular stress conditions around the wellbore, formed as a result of drilling, and increasing the permeability (50–100 percent) in the near wellbore zone (as a consequence of the first)

In the early 1970s, the Ministry of Geology of the USSR placed the Government order to scientific research institutions of the Country for the solution of the annular stress conditions and increase the permeability problem in the drilling wells. It was necessary to create the technology of opening the productive layer formation taking into account of uploading the annular stress conditions and increase the permeability in the near wellbore zone. The work to study this problem were assigned to the Institute of Oceanology and VNIMI (St. Petersburg, Russia). During the study there was done hundreds of experiments and mathematical models. At the same time the permeability in this zone increased 30 to 50 percent. The holes after cumulative, jet perforation, sand jet perforation, abrasive jetting perforation and other similar methods, do not give the effect. The spot perforation did not create a slot in the casing and did not reach the required (unloading effect) depth, because the reverse jet interfered with direct jet and the maximum depth of the hole could not exceed 0.65 feet. When perforation with the movement occurs, the direct jet does not intersect with the reverse jet and depth of cutting can be much more (up to five feet) which is known as the excavation effect. Later it was proven mathematically.

It was necessary to create a device, that could make the continuation, along the borehole, slots in the casing, cement and go further into the productive formation. The tests with the movement of the multimeter tubing were not been successful, showing it was impossible to create geometrically correct extended slots with moving tubing. It was necessary to create an apparatus, that created a movement of cutting jets by itself, independently from tubing and located on the end of the tubing, directly in the leveled area. independent movement of the cutting jets could only be done mechanically, electrically or hydraulically. After another six months of research and testing it was decided to use mechanics and hydraulics as the base. The first prototype of hydro-slotting perforation device was created in 1972. The technology of hydro-slotting perforation was never sold to anyone. The hydro-slotting perforation technology was transformed into the category of performance techniques (as the technique of conducting the drilling, cumulative perforation, hydraulic fracturing, logging, pumping and so on).

The finalization of the device (prototype) in the end of 1972 was tasked to the special laboratory of the Research Institute of Oceanology of PSU "Sevmorgeo". From the beginning of the work for the revision the existing device was carried out in two directions: hydro-slotting perforation and hydro-mechanical slotting perforation. The second variant differs from the first in that at the beginning the opening of the casing is produced with a circular saw, and then the rock eroded by working fluid (water and sand) jets. The works were done over three years. The work for improvements of the hydro-mechanical slotting perforation were terminated in the result of their further inexpedient. Firstly, it was not necessary to divide the process into two operations: cutting the casing with the circular saw and a further jet-slotting perforation, because the cutting of casing with jet-slotting perforation takes place in a matter of seconds. Second, the mechanism of the circular saw takes up a lot of space in the housing unit, it was impossible to use the energy of working fluid to full power for getting deep slots, the slots get small and not deep (not enough for occurs the unloading of the annular compressive stress conditions and increase the permeability in the near wellbore zone). The further project was focused for finishing the hydro-slotting perforation device only.

In 1975, the scientific research laboratory of the Research Institute of Oceanology of PSU Sevmorgeo completed the project to improve the prototype of hydro-slotting perforation tool and this tool has been able to operate independently of the tubing movement. Part of energy was used for the motion creation for the working rod with the perforator and nozzles; the other part of the energy was use for the cutting process (creating the continued slots along the wellbore through the casing and cement into the productive formation). The form and depth of the slots allowed the device to perform its main task, unloading the annular stress conditions and increase the permeability. The first practical tests in the wells were successfully made at the end of 1975 on "Archeda" field (Volgograd, Russia).

Benefits 
Ability to increase area of development
 Very deep penetration from three to six feet
 Vertical permeability
 Porosity increases four to five times
 Permeability increases 15 times
 Drainage volume increases six times

Ability to access reserves which are otherwise inaccessible
 In reservoirs located in close proximity to water, gas, and oil contacts
 In weakly permeable, tightly-cemented reservoirs
 In missed layers, or in layers covered by two or more columns

Gentle approach with the ability to repair well-bore damage
 In carbonates, dislodges clay particles and fines
 In sandstones, reduces sand mobility problems
 In deep gas sands, relieves overpressure damage from mud weight systems
 Does not crack casing or cement
 Maintains hydraulic integrity with no detonation impacts
 Redistributes stresses away from the near-well-bore zone

Development 

During the period from the date of the first prototype of hydro-slotting perforation tool to present day, the type and technological characteristics of the equipment was significantly improved. The modern underground hydro-slotting equipment represents the devices, capable to instantly cut through the steel casing, through the cement to delve into the productive formation and keep the jets in this state while moving along the borehole, keeping the same depth of cut. The continuous time without lifting to the surface is 11–15 hours (nozzles lifespan ~ 15 hours, perforator ~ seven wells, hydraulic engine ~ 40 wells).

Without lifting to the surface with the hydro-slotting tool can also:
 cut on the previous perforation (cumulative perforation)
 colmatation treatment
 cut the thin-interbedded layers
 mini hydraulic fracture stimulation
 create the continuous slot
 cut the shale
 accurate cut near the water reservoir or opposite in the injection wells
 bypass the water layers
 bypass the casing collars 
 cut a few casings
 chemical treatment
 sealing, direct and reverse flushing
 tubing pressure testing
 cut the casing at abandonment

The hydro-slotting perforation process does not deform the casing, does not create cracks in the cement and does not clog up the borders in the formation. The process of hydro-slotting perforation is controlled. The cutting speed and depth of cutting may be corrected with the temperature in the borehole, temperature of the working fluid, concentration, flow and pressure. At the end of the cutting process of a continuous slot the engine is set up to the initial position and ready for the next cutting interval. Hydro-slotting perforation sets the perfect geometry for the subsequent fracturing. Hydro-slotting perforation can be applied in any formation: shale, carbonates, sandstone and so on.

Further improvement of the equipment for hydro-slotting perforation must follow the scientific and technical progress in this technology, not on the way of mindless increase of the holes in the hydro jets pipe. It is necessary to make the underground hydraulic engine for horizontal wells, which must be sealed to prevent the ingress of sand and mud inside and maintain the centerline position relative to the wellbore. It is necessary to make a self-orientation perforator (a particularly important issue of orientation in horizontal wells). For the orientation of the tool it is necessary there is communication with the tool (preferably two-sided) and surface of the well. Taking into account the specific conditions of hydro-slotting perforation process, signaling from the tool and back possibly using ultrasound only. Then the cutting process can be fully controlled from the surface, and it will be possible to change the speed and depth of cutting the slots regardless of the temperature inside the well.

Patents 

Over the years this method has not undergone much change, but there are many patents on the method of hydro-slotting perforation. With the development of technological progress there has been continuously improved and refined equipment, but patents, regarding the hydro-slotting equipment in full is not so much, there are a few patents on parts.

 United States patents for complete hydro-slotting perforation equipment: US 8240369 B1, US 31,084
 Similar United States patents: US3130786, US4227582, US5337825, US6651741, US7073587, US7140429, US7568525, US20070187086, US20090101414, USRE21085, 166/55.2, 166/298, and E21B43/114
 United States patent for method of hydro-slotting perforation: US 20130105163 A1
 Similar United States patents: US3130786, US4047569, US4134453, US5445220, US6564868, US7568525, and US20050269100

References 

Russian inventions
Hydraulic fracturing
Soviet inventions